R. crocea may refer to:

 Ramariopsis crocea, a coral fungus
 Rhamnus crocea, an evergreen shrub
 Rhodotorula crocea, a pigmented yeast
 Romulea crocea, a flowering plant
 Rostanga crocea, a sea slug
 Russula crocea, a mycorrhizal fungus